Onur Dogan (born 8 September 1987), also known as Chu En-Le (Traditional Chinese: 朱恩樂), is a Turkish-born Taiwanese footballer who plays as a forward for Taiwan Premier League club Taichung Futuro and the Chinese Taipei national football team.

Dogan was born in Çanakkale but moved to Taiwan in 2009 and naturalized in 2014., Turkey, He chose to play for the Chinese Taipei national side, achieving his first cap later in 2014 and becoming the first foreign naturalized footballer to represent Taiwan.

Career
Dogan's mother discovered his talent in playing football. He started his youth football career when he was seven years old, as a senior player, he has played for Çanakkale Dardanelspor, Çanakkalespor, Çanakkale Arslancaspor and Çanakkale Mahmudiye Belediyespor in the Turkish lower amateur leagues.

He met a Taiwanese girl in Turkey and married her, as well as studying Chinese. They then moved to Taiwan. His wife had a connection with Tatung FC, who immediately signed him and he started to play for them, and helped the club to win the  2013 Intercity Football League.

Career stats

Honours
Tatung FC
Intercity Football League: 2013
Taiwan Football Premier League: 2018, 2019

International
In 2014, he was naturalized as a Republic of China citizen, and made his international debut against Guam on November 13.

International stats

International goals
Scores and results list Chinese Taipei's goal tally first.

References

External links
 TFF.org Profile
 Maçkolik Profile
 Eurosport Profile
 

1987 births
Living people
People from Çanakkale
Turkish footballers
Taiwanese footballers
Taiwanese expatriate footballers
Chinese Taipei international footballers
Association football forwards
Taiwanese people of Turkish descent
Taiwanese Muslims
Meizhou Hakka F.C. players
China League One players
Expatriate footballers in China
Naturalised citizens of Taiwan